Load Records was an independent record label based out of Providence, Rhode Island, specializing in noise and experimental music.  Load Records was started in 1993 by Ben McOsker in order to release a 7-inch record for the band Boss Fuel.  The label quickly became the most prominent source for noise music coming out of the Providence scene, issuing over 100 releases until folding in 2017.

Bands such as Lightning Bolt, Noxagt, Sightings, Landed, Arab on Radar, Brainbombs, The White Mice, and Pink and Brown released records through Load.  Load Records also re-released records originating from other labels, such as the United States release of Close Calls with Brick Walls by Andrew W.K. and the vinyl editions of The Very Best of Men's Recovery Project by Men's Recovery Project and Things Viral by Khanate.

Catalog
This list is organized by catalog number, a roughly chronological number system established by the label and typically printed on or assigned to each official release.

{|class="wikitable"
! Year
! No.
! Artist
! Title
! Co-releases
|-
|align="center" rowspan="2"|1993
|align="center"|1
|Boss Fuel
|Just Like Everybody Else Would / Bender
|
|-
|align="center" align="center"|2
|Von Ryan Express
|Up on the Block
|
|-
|align="center" rowspan="2"|1994
|align="center"|3
|Boss Fuel
|The Ride / Rumble Mambo
|
|-
|align="center"|4
|Golden Touch
|Hits the Sweet Spot
|
|-
|align="center" rowspan="2"|1995
|align="center"|5
|Pistolwhip
|Devil Deep / Seeing Red
|
|-
|align="center"|6
|Thee Hydrogen Terrors
|The Erotic Adventures ofThee Hydrogen Terrors
|
|-
|align="center" rowspan="5"|1996
|align="center"|7
|The Scissor Girls
|So that You can Start toSee what S-T-A-T-I-C-L-A-N-D
|
|-
|align="center"|8
|Six Finger Satellite
|Clone Theory
|
|-
|align="center"|9
|various artists
|Repopulation Program
|
|-
|align="center"|10
|Thee Hydrogen Terrors
|Terror, Diplomacy & Public Relations
|
|-
|align="center"|11
|
|
|
|-
|align="center" rowspan="6"|1997
|align="center"|12
|Lightning Bolt / Forcefield
|split
|
|-
|align="center"|13
|Olneyville Sound System
|Because We Are All In It Together
|
|-
|align="center"|13
|John Von Ryan
|Organs vs. Furniture
|
|-
|align="center"|14
|Gerty Farish
|Bulks Up
|
|-
|align="center"|15
|Olneyville Sound System
|Because We're All In It Together
|
|-
|align="center"|16
|
|
|
|-
|align="center" rowspan="2"|1998
|align="center"|17
|Astoveboat
|New Bedford
|
|-
|align="center"|18
|Landed
|Dairy 4 Dinner
|
|-
|align="center"|1999
|align="center"|19
|Brainbombs
|Singles Compilation
|
|-
|align="center"|2000
|align="center"|20
|Men's Recovery Project
|Bolides over Basra
|
|-
|align="center"|1999
|align="center"|22
|Brainbombs
|Urge to Kill
|
|-
|align="center" rowspan="2"|1998
|align="center"|23
|Arab on Radar
|Swimming with a Hard-On
|
|-
|align="center"|24
|Pleasurehorse
|Dropdead Deconstructed
|Over the Counter Records
|-
|align="center" rowspan="3"|1999
|align="center"|25
|various artists
|You're Soaking in It
|
|-
|align="center"|26
|Lightning Bolt
|Lightning Bolt
|
|-
|align="center"|27
|Brainbombs
|Singles Compilation
|
|-
|
|align="center"|28
|—
|—
|
|-
|align="center" rowspan="2"|2000
|align="center"|29
|Lightning Bolt
|Conan
|
|-
|align="center"|30
|Mystery Brinkman / Pleasurehorse 
|split
|
|-
|align="center"|2001
|align="center"|31
|Lightning Bolt
|Ride the Skies
|
|-
|align="center"|2003
|align="center"|32
|Hawd Gankstuh RappuhsMC's (Wid Ghatz)
|Wake Up and Smell the Piss
|
|-
|align="center" rowspan="2"|2001
|align="center"|33
|Vaz
|Demonstrations in Micronesia
|
|-
|align="center"|34
|Brainbombs
|Cheap
|
|-
|align="center" rowspan="3"|2002
|align="center"|35
|Sightings
|Sightings
|
|-
|align="center"|36
|Pink and Brown / Death Drug
|split
|
|-
|align="center"|37
|Olneyville Sound System
|What is True, What is False
|
|-
|align="center" rowspan="5"|2003
|align="center"|38
|Forcefield
|Roggaboggas
|
|-
|align="center"|39
|Pleasurehorse
|Bareskinrug
|
|-
|align="center"|40
|rowspan="2"|Lightning Bolt
|The Power of Salad
|
|-
|align="center"|41
|Wonderful Rainbow
|
|-
|align="center"|42
|Neon Hunk
|Smarmymob
|
|-
|
|align="center"|43
|Pink and Brown
|Shame Fantasy II LP
|
|-
|align="center" rowspan="6"|2003
|align="center"|44
|Noxagt
|Turning it Down Since 2001
|
|-
|align="center"|45
|Pink and Brown
|Shame Fantasy II
|
|-
|align="center"|46
|Friends Forever
|Killball
|
|-
|align="center"|47
|Viki / Hair Police
|split
|
|-
|align="center"|48
|Sightings
|Absolutes
|
|-
|align="center"|49
|Khanate
|No Joy (Remix)
|
|-
|align="center"|2004
|align="center"|50
|various artists
|Pick a Winner
|
|-
|align="center" rowspan="6"|2003
|align="center"|51
|Vincebus Eruptum
|Vincebus Eruptum
|
|-
|align="center"|52
|Mr. California and the State Police
|Audio Hallucinations
|
|-
|align="center"|53
|Kites
|Royal Paint with the Metallic Gardenerfrom the United States Helped into anOpen Field by Women and Children
|
|-
|align="center"|54
|Total Shutdown
|The Album
|Tigerbeat6
|-
|align="center"|55
|Khanate
|Things Viral
|Southern Lord Records
|-
|align="center"|56
|The USA Is a Monster
|Tasheyana Compost
|
|-
|align="center" rowspan="2"|2004
|align="center"|57
|Noxagt
|The Iron Point
|
|-
|align="center"|58
|Necronomitron
|Necronomitron
|
|-
|align="center"|2005
|align="center"|59
|Mindflayer
|It's Always 1999
|Ooo Mau Mau Records
|-
|align="center" rowspan="6"|2004
|align="center"|60
|Metalux
|Waiting for Armadillo
|
|-
|align="center"|61
|Nautical Almanac
|Rooting for the Microbes
|
|-
|align="center"|62
|Kites / Prurient
|split
|
|-
|align="center"|63
|Fat Day
|Unf! Unf!
|
|-
|align="center"|64
|Burmese
|Men
|
|-
|align="center"|65
|Sightings
|Arrived in Gold
|
|-
|align="center" rowspan="3"|2005
|align="center"|66
|The White Mice
|ASSPhIXXXEATEASHUN
|
|-
|align="center"|67
|Coughs
|Fright Makes Right
|
|-
|align="center"|68
|Excepter
|Throne
|
|-
|align="center"|2006
|align="center"|69
|Noxagt
|Noxagt
|
|-
|align="center" rowspan="3"|2005
|align="center"|70
|Ultralyd
|Chromosome Gun
|
|-
|align="center"|71
|Hospitals
|I've Visited the Islands of Jocks and Jazz
|
|-
|align="center"|72
|Prurient
|Black Vase
|
|-
|align="center" rowspan="2"|2006
|align="center"|73
|Vampire Can't
|Key Cutter
|
|-
|align="center"|74
|Fat Worm of Error
|Pregnant Babies Pregnantwith Pregnant Babies
|
|-
|align="center" rowspan="2"|2005
|align="center"|75
|Men's Recovery Project
|The Very Best of Men's Recovery Project
|5 Rue Christine
|-
|align="center"|76
|The USA Is a Monster
|Wohaw
|
|-
|
|align="center"|77
|—
|—
|
|-
|align="center"|2005
|align="center"|78
|Lightning Bolt
|Hypermagic Mountain
|
|-
|align="center" rowspan="2"|2006
|align="center"|79
|Impractical Cockpit
|To be Treated
|
|-
|align="center"|80
|Wizardzz
|Hidden City of Taurmond
|
|-
|align="center"|2005
|align="center"|81
|Kites
|Peace Trials
|
|-
|align="center"|2006
|align="center"|82
|Metalux / John Wiese
|Exoteric
|
|-
|
|align="center"|83
|—
|—
|
|-
|align="center"|2006
|align="center"|84
|The USA Is a Monster
|Sunset at the End of the Industrial Age
|
|-
|
|align="center"|85
|—
|—
|
|-
|align="center" rowspan="6"|2006
|align="center"|86
|Diskaholics
|Live in Japan, v.1
|
|-
|align="center"|87
|various artists
|Fun From None: Live at the NoFun Fest 2004 - 2005
|
|-
|align="center"|88
|Coughs
|Secret Passage
|
|-
|align="center"|89
|Barkley's Barnyard Critters
|Mystery Tail
|
|-
|align="center"|90
|Yellow Swans
|Psychic Secession
|
|-
|align="center"|91
|OvO
|Miastenia
|
|-
|
|align="center"|92
|—
|—
|
|-
|align="center" rowspan="3"|2006
|align="center"|93
|Landed
|Times I Despise
|
|-
|align="center"|94
|Gang Wizard
|Byzantine Headache
|
|-
|align="center"|95
|Paper Rad
|Trash Talking
|
|-
|align="center" rowspan="2"|2007
|align="center"|96
|Yellow Swans
|At All Ends
|
|-
|align="center"|97
|Justice Yeldham
|Live in School
|
|-
|align="center"| 2006
|align="center"|98
|Noise Nomads
|Noise Nomads
|
|-
|align="center"|2007
|align="center"|99
|The White Mice
|BLasssTPhlEgMEICE
|
|-
|
|align="center"|100
|—
|—
|
|-
|align="center"|2006
|align="center"|101
|Prurient
|Pleasure Ground
|
|-
|align="center"|2008
|align="center"|102
|Shit and Shine
|Küss Mich, Meine Liebe
|
|-
|align="center" rowspan="7"|2007
|align="center"|103
|Mouthus
|Saw a Halo
|
|-
|align="center"|104
|Silver Daggers
|New High & Ord
|
|-
|align="center"|105
|Hetero Skeleton
|En La Sombre Del Pejaro Velludo
|
|-
|align="center"|106
|Air Conditioning
|Dead Rails
|
|-
|align="center"|107
|Sword Heaven
|Entrance
|
|-
|align="center"|108
|Monotract
|Trueno Oscuro
|
|-
|align="center"|109
|Clockcleaner
|Babylon Rules
|
|-
|align="center"| 2009
|align="center"|110
|Homostupids
|The Load
|
|-
| rowspan="5" align="center"|2007
|align="center"|111
|Andrew W.K.
|Close Calls with Brick Walls
|Universal Records
|-
|align="center"|112
|Business Lady
|Torture Footage
|
|-
|align="center"|113
|Kites
|Hallucination Guillotine / Final Worship
|
|-
|align="center"|114
|DJ Scotch Egg
|Drumized
|
|-
|align="center"|115
|Landed
|How Little Will it Take
|
|-
|rowspan="3"| 
|align="center"|116
|—
|—
|
|-
|align="center"|117
|—
|—
|
|-
|align="center"|118
|—
|—
|
|-
|align="center"|2007
|align="center"|119
|Sightings
|Through the Panama
|Ecstatic Peace!
|-
|align="center"|2009
|align="center"|120
|OvO
|Croce Via
|
|-
|align="center" rowspan="2"| 2008
|align="center"|121
|Harry Pussy
|You'll Never Play This Town Again
|
|-
|align="center"|122
|The USA Is a Monster
|Space Programs
|
|-
|align="center" rowspan="4"|2009
|align="center"|123
|Rusted Shut
|Dead
|
|-
|align="center"|124
|—
|—
|
|-
|align="center"|125
|Six Finger Satellite
|Half Control
|
|-
|align="center"| 126
|Lightning Bolt
|Earthly Delights
|
|-
|align="center" rowspan="6"|2010
|align="center"|127
|Tinsel Teeth
|Trash As The Trophy
|
|-
|align="center"|128
|—
|—
|
|-
|align="center"|129
|Sword Heaven
|Gone
|
|-
|align="center"|130
|Clockcleaner
|Auf-Wiedersehen
|
|-
|align="center"|131
|Daily Life
|Necessary And Pathetic
|
|-
|align="center"|132
|—
|—
|
|-
|align="center" rowspan="5"|2011
|align="center"|133
|Black Pus
|Primordial Pus
|
|-
|align="center"|134
|Ed Schrader's Music Beat
|"Sermon" b/w "Rats" 7"
|
|-
|align="center"|135
|Sex Church
|Growing Over
|
|-
|align="center"|136
|Skoal Kodiak
|Kryptonym Bodliak
|
|-
|align="center"|137
|—
|—
|
|-
|align="center" rowspan="5"|2012
|align="center"|138
|FNU Ronnies
|Saddle Up
|
|-
|align="center"|139
|Ed Schrader's Music Beat 
|Jazz Mind
|
|-
|align="center"|140
|White Load
|Wayne's World 3 b/w Godfather 4
|
|-
|align="center"|141
|White Suns
|Sinews
|
|-
|align="center"|142
|Lightning Bolt
|Oblivion Hunter
|
|-
|align="center" rowspan="3"|2013
|align="center"|143
|Dead Air
|Dead Air
|
|-
|align="center"|144
|Humanbeast 
|Venus Ejaculates into the Banquet
|
|-
|align="center"|145
|Whore Paint
|Swallow My Bones
|
|-
|align="center" rowspan="1"|2014
|align="center"|146
|Timeghost
|Cellular
|
|-
|align="center" rowspan="1"|2015
|align="center"|147
|Tropical Trash
|UFO Rot
|
|-
|align="center" rowspan="1"|2016
|align="center"|148
|Finished
|Cum Inside Me Bro
|
|-
|
|
|
|
|
|}

"—" denotes unassigned catalog numbers.

References

General
  Note: User must navigate to Pop > Label, and enter "Load" in text box.  Select first search result.

Specific

External links
Load Records website

Discographies of American record labels